Happyland is satirical novel written by J. Robert Lennon about a town in upstate New York that is taken over by a doll maker. Some have interpreted the plot as an account of American Girl founder Pleasant Rowland's attempt to develop the village of Aurora, Cayuga County, New York, into a quaint tourism destination. The novel also features a women's college, very much like Rowland's alma mater Wells College and portrays it as a center of lesbian activity.

In 2006, Happyland was dropped by publisher W. W. Norton, which had previously published Lennon's book Mailman. Instead, it was published as a five-part serial in Harper's Magazine.

External links
 Interview in the Aurora, NY local newspaper
 Report on Happyland in the Ithaca Times
 Aurora NY, the village that inspired Happyland

References

2006 American novels
Novels first published in serial form
American satirical novels
Works originally published in Harper's Magazine
Novels set in New York (state)
Novels based on actual events